Aramos ramosa is a moth in the family Cossidae. It is found in Texas in the United States and Quintana Roo and Yucatán in Mexico.

Adults have been recorded on wing in June and from August to October.

References

Natural History Museum Lepidoptera generic names catalog

Zeuzerinae
Moths described in 1892